Walter Aston, 3rd Lord Aston of Forfar (1633 – 20 November 1714) was the eldest son of Walter Aston, 2nd Lord Aston of Forfar, and his wife Lady Mary Weston, daughter of Richard Weston, 1st Earl of Portland. He is best remembered today as a fortunate survivor of the Popish Plot.

He succeeded his father as Lord Aston of Forfar in the peerage of Scotland in 1678; he resided mainly at Tixall in Staffordshire. He also owned an estate at Standon in Hertfordshire, which came to the Aston family by inheritance from their Sadler relatives.

Family

He was twice married, first marrying Eleanor Blount Knightley of Soddington in Worcestershire, England, widow of Robert Knightley, and daughter of Sir Walter Blount, 1st Baronet, and his wife Elizabeth Wylde, daughter of George Wylde, by whom he had five surviving children, and who died in 1674. He married secondly Catherine Gage, daughter of Sir Thomas Gage, 2nd Baronet of Firle in Sussex and Mary Chamberlain of Sherborne Castle, who died in 1720.

By Elizabeth, he had four sons who reached adulthood, Edward, Francis, Walter, 4th Lord Aston and Charles, and one daughter Mary, who never married. Edward and Francis predeceased their father and Walter succeeded to the title.

Popish Plot

Like his father, he was an ardent Roman Catholic, and succeeded in his father's role as the unofficial leader of the large Catholic community in Staffordshire. As such, he was a principal target of the informers during the Popish Plot. His former steward Stephen Dugdale, whom he had dismissed for stealing money to pay his gambling debts, turned on him and gave perjured evidence which sent Aston and his brother William to the Tower of London in 1679 on charges of conspiracy to kill King Charles II Dugdale was a charming, educated and plausible man, who made a noticeably different impression on the Government from the unsavoury parade of previous informers like Titus Oates and Thomas Dangerfield, some of whom were notorious criminals. Even King Charles, who had been entirely sceptical about the Plot, was so impressed by Dugdale that "he began to think there was somewhat in it (the Plot)".

In the event, it proved impossible to find a second witness to the charge of treason against Lord Aston, and even at the height of the Plot hysteria, the judges scrupulously observed the rule that a charge of treason required two witnesses. Aston was never brought to trial, and was released on bail in the summer of 1680. He never returned to prison.

Later years

Under the Catholic King James II he was in favour at Court, and served as Lord Lieutenant of Staffordshire from 1687 to 1689. After the Glorious Revolution, he remained loyal to James, but no action was taken against him as a result. In his last years, he felt sufficiently secure in his position to complain about his exclusion, on the grounds of his religion, from the House of Lords. As his peerage was a Scots title he argued that he should be one of the Scottish representative peers who took their seats in the unified House of Lords after the Act of Union 1707, but his claim to be entitled to sit in the Lords was rejected.

He died in 1714, and was succeeded by his third but eldest surviving son Walter Aston, 4th Lord Aston of Forfar. A younger son, Charles Aston, served with the British Army in Ireland and was killed in action at the Battle of the Boyne, 1 July 1690.

References 

Paul, James Balfour. (1904.) "The Scots Peerage: Founded on Wood's Edition of Sir Robert Douglas's Peerage, Volume I". David Douglas: Edinburgh, pp. 411–412. Retrieved 2007-10-11.

Lord-Lieutenants of Staffordshire
1633 births
1714 deaths
Lords of Parliament (pre-1707)